Northern Antioquia is a subregion in the Colombian Department of Antioquia. The region is made up of 17 municipalities.

Municipalities

 Angostura
 Belmira
 Briceño
 Campamento
 Carolina del Príncipe
 Don Matías
 Entrerríos
 Gómez Plata
 Guadalupe
 Ituango
 San Andrés
 San José de la Montaña
 San Pedro
 Santa Rosa de Osos
 Toledo
 Valdivia
 Yarumal

Regions of Antioquia Department